This is a list of universities in the Comoros.

List
University Comoros
Kampala University

References

Education in the Comoros
Educational organizations based in the Comoros
Comoros
Universities
Comoros